The 2016 Pan American Judo Championships was held in Havana, Cuba from 29 to 30 April 2016.

Results

Men's events

Women's events

Medal table
Key

References

External links
 
 2016 Pan American Championships results
 Pan American Judo Confederation

2016
American Championships
Pan American Judo Championships
Judo competitions in Cuba
International sports competitions hosted by Cuba